Matthias Durst (18 August 1815 – 2 May 1875) was an Austrian violinist, violist and composer.

Biography
Born in Vienna, he studied at the Vienna Conservatory with Georg Hellmesberger, Sr. and Joseph Böhm. He was a member of the Vienna Burgtheater. From 1841 he was appointed at the Vienna Court Orchestra. He was professor at the Kirchenmusikverein at St. Anna.

From 1845 he played in the string quartet, with Leopold Jansa, Carl Heißler and Carl Schlesinger, which in 1849 became the Hellmesberger Quartet, with Joseph Hellmesberger, Sr. taking over from Jansa.

Works
Durst composed overtures, string quartets, violin duos, and solos.

References
Biography from musiklexikon.ac.at, under External links

External links
Biography from musiklexikon.ac.at

1815 births
1875 deaths
Austrian classical violinists
Austrian classical violists
Austrian male composers
Austrian composers
19th-century composers
19th-century classical violinists
Male classical violinists
19th-century male musicians